FC Eindhoven Futsal is a futsal club based in Eindhoven, Netherlands. The club was founded in 1977.

Honours

  Topdivisie:4 (2009–10, 2010–11, 2011–12, 2012-13)
 Dutch Futsal Cup: 2 (2010, 2012)
Dutch Super Cup:3 (2011, 2012, 2013)

References
 uefa.com

Externan link
Official Website

Futsal clubs in the Netherlands
Futsal clubs established in 1977
1977 establishments in the Netherlands